Van Hasselt's sunbird (Leptocoma brasiliana), is a species of bird in the family Nectariniidae. It is found in Northeast India, Bangladesh and Southeast Asia.
Its natural habitats are subtropical or tropical moist lowland forests and subtropical or tropical mangrove forests.

It used to be considered a subspecies of the purple-throated sunbird.

In 1939, a group of bird lovers in Hawaii known as the Hui Manu released 28 of these birds on various parts of the leeward side of Oahu in Hawaii in an attempt to get them to become established there; none appeared have succeeded.

References

Rasmussen, P.C., and J.C. Anderton. 2005. Birds of South Asia. The Ripley guide. Volume 2: attributes and status. Smithsonian Institution and Lynx Edicions, Washington D.C. and Barcelona.

Van Hasselt's sunbird
Birds of Northeast India
Birds of Southeast Asia
Van Hasselt's sunbird
Van Hasselt's sunbird